The Atlantic Treaty Association (ATA) is an umbrella organization which draws together political leaders, academics, military officials, and diplomats to support the North Atlantic Treaty Organization (NATO). The ATA is an independent organization that is separate from NATO.

History 
The ATA was created on 18 June 1954. Since the end of the Cold War and the dissolution of the Warsaw Pact, the role of the Atlantic Treaty Association has changed considerably. In 1992, the ATA Constitution was amended to accommodate associate members and observers from non-NATO countries. In 1992, the Atlantic Club of Bulgaria joined the ATA as its first associated member from a non-NATO country. Given NATO's shifting nature, the ATA now works beyond the borders of the Euro-Atlantic area, operating in Central and Eastern Europe, the Mediterranean, and the South Caucasus. Following the accession of new NATO countries in 1999 and 2004, ATA membership expanded considerably, and its security focus has shifted south and eastward.

The ATA is active in NATO's Partnership for Peace (PfP) and Mediterranean Dialogue programs and is increasingly engaged with officials and institutions based in members of the Istanbul Cooperation Initiative (ICI) and Partners Across the Globe.

Mission 
The Atlantic Treaty Association's stated mission is to support the values set forth in the North Atlantic Treaty: freedom, liberty, peace, security, and the rule of law. As such, the ATA aims to serve as a forum for debate in which member associations can realize common interests and democratic goals.
The youth branch of the ATA, the Youth Atlantic Treaty Association (YATA) was created in 1996. YATA seeks to educate and promote debate among youth in order to create responsible future political leaders who have an understanding of the values set forth in the North Atlantic Treaty.

Structure 
The ATA is composed of three main bodies: the Assembly, the Bureau, and the Council.

The Assembly 
The Assembly is the top decision-making body of the ATA and is composed of delegates from Member, Associate Member, and Observer Member associations. With the exception of Observer Members, each delegate has one vote, and resolutions are passed by a simple majority. In addition to the delegates, members of the press and academic community, government and military officials, and international observers may attend the General Assembly meetings, which are held once a year.

The Bureau 
The Bureau includes the president, vice presidents, secretary general, treasurer, YATA president and the legal adviser. Members of the Bureau assist in carrying out the decisions of the Council and the Assembly and aid in policy matters.

The Council 
The Council comprises Bureau members plus up to three delegates from each of the ATA Member, Associate Member and Observer Member associations. The ATA allows the Council to take action on its behalf, with the recommendation of the Bureau and the approval of the Assembly. The Council holds two meetings a year: one at NATO Headquarters and one in a host country.

Member organizations

NATO countries
Albania, Albanian Atlantic Association
Belgium, Association Atlantique Belge
Bulgaria, The Atlantic Club of Bulgaria
Canada, NATO Association of Canada
Croatia, Atlantic Council of Croatia
Czechia, Jagello 2000
Denmark, Atlantsammenslutningen
Estonia, Estonian Atlantic Treaty Association
Germany, Deutsche Atlantische Gesellschaft
Greece, Greek Association for Atlantic and European Cooperation
Hungary, Hungarian Atlantic Council
Iceland, Samtök um Vestraena Samvinnu
Italy, Comitato Italiano Atlantico
Latvia, Latvian Transatlantic Organization
Lithuania, Lithuanian Atlantic Treaty Association
Netherlands, De Atlantische Commissie
Norway, Den Norske Atlanterhavskomite
Portugal, Comissão Portuguesa do Atlântico
North Macedonia, Euro-Atlantic Club of the Republic of Macedonia
Romania, Euro-Atlantic Council
Slovakia, GLOBSEC
Slovenia, The Euro-Atlantic Council of Slovenia
Spain, Asociación Atlantica Española
Turkey, Türk Atlantik Antlaşması Derneği
United Kingdom, Atlantic Council of the United Kingdom
United States, Atlantic Council

Partnership for Peace countries
Armenia, Armenian Atlantic Association
Azerbaijan, Azerbaijan Atlantic Cooperation
Georgia, Georgian Association of Atlantic Collaboration
Finland, Atlantic Council of Finland
Serbia, Atlantic Council of Serbia
Sweden, Swedish Atlantic Council
Ukraine, The Atlantic Council of Ukraine

Presidents
 2003–2008: Bob Hunter, former US Ambassador to NATO (United States)
 2008–2015: Karl A. Lamers (Germany)
 2015–2020: Fabrizio Luciolli (Italy)
 2020-present: James J. Townsend (United States)

See also
 Atlanticism
 Euro-Atlantic Partnership Council
 Foreign relations of NATO
 Individual Partnership Action Plan

References

External links

Organizations related to NATO
International political organizations
Organizations established in 1954
1954 establishments in the United States